Arise Therefore is the fourth studio album by Will Oldham. It was released in 1996 under the moniker Palace Music, although sometimes credited simply to "Palace". The album features David Grubbs, Ned Oldham, and a Mayatone drum machine credited as "Maya Tone". It was recorded by Steve Albini at Pachyderm Studio in Cannon Falls, Minnesota.

Critical reception

Kurt Wolff of AllMusic gave the album 4 out of 5 stars and praised the lyrics, calling them "beautiful in their stark, pale honesty as often as they are indecipherable."

Track listing

Personnel
Credits adapted from liner notes.

 David Grubbs – piano, organ
 Ned Oldham – bass guitar, effected guitar, additional vocals
 Will Oldham – vocals, electric guitar
 Maya Tone – drums, percussion
 Steve Albini – recording
 John Golden – mastering
 Gene Booth – artwork

References

External links
 

1996 albums
Will Oldham albums
Drag City (record label) albums
Albums produced by Steve Albini